Húsavík is a town in Norðurþing municipality on the north coast of Iceland on the shores of Skjálfandi bay with 2,307 inhabitants. The most famous landmark of the town is the wooden church Húsavíkurkirkja, built in 1907. Húsavík is served by Húsavík Airport.

Overview
Income is derived from tourism and fishing, as well as retail and small industry.  Until recently, Húsavík was the export harbour for silica that was extracted from nearby lake Mývatn.

According to the Landnámabók ("Book of Settlement"), Húsavík was the first place in Iceland to be settled by a Norseman. The Swedish Viking Garðar Svavarsson stayed there for one winter around 870 A.D.  When he left the island in spring of 870, after a winter's stay, he left behind a man named Náttfari and two slaves, a man and a woman, and they established a farm here. The name of the town means "bay of houses", probably referring to Garðar's homestead, which may have been the only houses then in Iceland.

Tourism
Húsavík has become a centre of whale watching in Iceland due to whales of different species that frequently enter the bay.
The Húsavík Whale Museum is located in the town centre by the harbour.

In town there is also a civic museum about culture and biology.
Among other things, it shows a stuffed polar bear (arrived in Grímsey in 1969) and ancient boats.

Each year in mid July, Húsavík holds a festival called Mærudagar , which translates to “Candy Days”. Thousands of people from all over Iceland come to the tiny town to enjoy this occasion which consists of music, colourful decorations, and an array of food and drink.

Húsavík is also home to The Exploration Museum, a museum about the history of human exploration. A monument honouring the Apollo astronauts that trained around Húsavík during the 1960s is located outside the museum.

The Eurovision Museum, dedicated to the Eurovision Song Contest, had its soft opening in October 2021. An official grand opening will happen sometime in 2022.

The region of Mývatn, with its interesting geology and diverse animal life, is nearby. Jökulsárgljúfur National Park with the horseshoe-shaped canyon Ásbyrgi and the waterfalls Dettifoss, Hafragilsfoss and Selfoss is also not far from the town.

Sports
ÍF Völsungur is the local football club. They last played in Iceland's top tier in the 1988 season.

Popular culture
Húsavík served as the setting of the 2020 Netflix film Eurovision Song Contest: The Story of Fire Saga, a comedic story of two Húsavík natives representing Iceland in the Eurovision Song Contest, with one of the film's songs named after the town. The song itself was nominated for the Academy Award for Best Original Song at the 93rd Academy Awards.

The song's taped Best Original Song performance was filmed on location in Húsavík. In a break with Oscar tradition, all five songs had their performances pre-taped due to the COVID-19 pandemic instead of being performed live. "Húsavík" was the only one of the five nominated songs to have its pre-taped performance take place outside of the United States.

On 25 April 2021, the performance aired along with pre-taped performances of the other four nominated songs in that year's category. All five song performances were shown during the red carpet pre-show special that took place just before the main ceremony began.

Residents of the town reported a significant jump in tourism following the film's release. In 2021, The Eurovision Museum opened in Húsavík telling the story of the song contest and the film.

International relations

Twin towns – Sister cities
Karlskoga, Sweden
Fredrikstad, Norway
Riihimäki, Finland
Aalborg, Denmark
Qeqertarsuaq, Greenland
Fuglafjørður, Faroe Islands
Eastport, Maine, USA

Climate

Daylight hours

Húsavík experiences midnight sun from 11 June until 29 June.

Although Húsavík doesn't experience polar night in December solstice, the shortest daylight hours in Húsavík are 2 hours 45 minutes, from 11:45 UTC until 14:30 UTC on 21 December.

Gallery

See also
History of Iceland
Húsavík Chamber of Commerce and Tourism
List of cities and towns in Iceland
Volcanism of Iceland

References

External links

 Official tourist information website 
Official website 
  Whalewatching and information about whales
Húsavík whale watching

 
Populated places in Northeastern Region (Iceland)